Svetoslav Petrov (born 20 August 1988) is a Bulgarian footballer currently playing for Lyubimets 2007 as a midfielder.

Petrov played for Vihren Sandanski before joining Sportist Svoge in January 2010.

References

External links
 

1988 births
Living people
Bulgarian footballers
Association football midfielders
OFC Vihren Sandanski players
FC Sportist Svoge players
OFC Sliven 2000 players
FC Lokomotiv 1929 Sofia players
FC Lyubimets players
First Professional Football League (Bulgaria) players
People from Sandanski
Sportspeople from Blagoevgrad Province